Acleris macdunnoughi is a species of moth of the family Tortricidae. It is found in North America, where it has been recorded from Alberta, Kentucky, Maine, Massachusetts, Michigan, Minnesota, Montana, New Brunswick, North Carolina, Ohio, Ontario, Pennsylvania, Quebec, Tennessee, Vermont, Washington and West Virginia.

The forewings are whitish brown-grey with fine dark brown striation. The hindwings are smoky brownish. Adults have been recorded on wing from April to October.

The larvae feed on Rubus species and Spiraea latifolia.

References

Moths described in 1963
macdunnoughi
Moths of North America